Momo is a town located in Woleu-Ntem province, Gabon.

Populated places in Woleu-Ntem Province